Several vessels have been named Ellice:

 was launched in Bermuda. From 1800 to her loss she was a hired transport for the government, carrying passengers and cargo between London and the Mediterranean, sailing as far as Malta. She was wrecked in November 1817.
 was launched in 1824 in Sunderland as a West Indiaman. She disappeared after 28 April 1829.

See also
 was launched in New Brunswick and sailed to England where she was re-registered. She was sold in 1822 in South America.
 was launched as a West Indiaman. Later, she traded more widely, including making two voyages to India under a license from the British East India Company (EIC). She survived two maritime misadventures only to suffer a final wrecking in August 1838.

Ship names